The canton of Luxeuil-les-Bains is an administrative division of the Haute-Saône department, northeastern France. Its borders were modified at the French canton reorganisation which came into effect in March 2015. Its seat is in Luxeuil-les-Bains.

It consists of the following communes:
 
Ailloncourt
Baudoncourt
Breuches
Brotte-lès-Luxeuil
La Chapelle-lès-Luxeuil
Citers
Esboz-Brest
Fougerolles-Saint-Valbert (partly)
Froideconche
Luxeuil-les-Bains
Ormoiche
Saint-Sauveur

References

Cantons of Haute-Saône